Road Less Traveled is the second studio album by American country music artist Lauren Alaina. The album was released on January 27, 2017, by Mercury Nashville and Interscope Records. It includes the number one single of the same name.

Background
In January 2013, Alaina tweeted that she had started recording for her second album. She released a new song, "Barefoot and Buckwild", as the record's purported lead single in May 2013, however it failed to perform on the charts. In August 2014, Alaina underwent vocal surgery; after her recovery, she returned to the studio to work on new material with a "more mature" feel. By June 2015, she stated that the album was nearly finished. Alaina has said that this album will be different from her first and describes it as, "[having] some fun songs and sad songs – a little bit of what my life has been like over the past few years."

The album features four tracks that are on Alaina's self-titled EP, which was released in October 2015. Alaina announced the album's title and track listing on December 5, 2016. Alaina co-wrote all twelve tracks over three and a half years. Road Less Traveled became available for pre-order on December 16, 2016.

Singles
"Next Boyfriend" was released as the album's first single on September 15, 2015.

The title track, "Road Less Traveled" was released as the album's second single on July 11, 2016. It had previously served as the second single from Alaina's 2015 self-titled EP.

"Doin' Fine" impacted American country radio on May 22, 2017 as the album's third single.

Other songs
"Queen of Hearts" was released to digital retailers as the album's first promotional single on December 30, 2016. "Same Day Different Bottle" was released as the second promotional single on January 13, 2017.

Critical reception

Road Less Traveled received generally mixed-to-positive reviews from music critics. Stephen Thomas Erlewine of AllMusic rated the album three-and-a-half stars out of five and complimented Alaina on her songwriting. "She may drift into the saccharine when she slows the tempo," he writes, "but the faster cuts are usually jubilant and help propel Road Less Traveled... into a strong modern country-pop album." Marissa Moss of Rolling Stone wrote that the album "marks not just a transition from singer to writer," but "[traces] the events of [Alaina's] life," through inspiring songs that, she says, harken back to the peak of Shania Twain's career. Katie Gill of pop culture blog The Young Folks rated the album six out of ten for its "polished" production and "uneven" songwriting. "When it's good, it's ridiculously good," she writes, "but the majority of the songs are middle of the road to outright bad."

Matt Bjorke of Roughstock wrote a positive review of the album, which he says showcases Alaina's "growth" both as an artist and as a person and which "[feels] ready to make Lauren a household name." Laura Hostelley of Sounds Like Nashville praised the "carefully crafted" album for combining personal lyrics with "modern and consistent" production that "allows opportunities for Alaina's voice to hold the spotlight." In the blog's Album Spotlight feature, Taste of Country writer Cillea Houghton gave the album a mixed review. "Road Less Traveled starts off strong," she writes, "but gets a little watered down in the middle... But where it blends in melodically, Road Less Traveled stands out at the core with its lyrics, all about empowerment, positivity and loving yourself no matter what you’re faced with in life."

Commercial performance
The album debuted at No. 31 on the Billboard 200, and No. 3 on Top Country Albums in its first week of release. It sold 9,700 copies in the first week, and a further 2,800 in the second week. The album has sold 34,500 copies in the US as of January 2018.

Track listing

Personnel
Vocals

Lauren Alaina – Lead vocals, Background vocals
Erika Atwater – Background vocals
busbee – Background vocals
Stephcynie Curry – Background vocals
Seth Ennis – Background vocals
Morgan Hebert – Background vocals
Carolyn Dawn Johnson – Background vocals
Kim Keyes – Background vocals
Kristin Rogers – Background vocals
Russell Terrell – Background vocals
Emily Weisband – Background vocals

Musicians

busbee – Keyboards, piano
Joeie Canaday – Bass guitar
Dave Cohen – Hammond B-3 organ, piano, synthesizer, Wurlitzer
J.T. Corenflos – Electric guitar
David Dorn – Hammond B-3 organ, piano, synthesizer, Wurlitzer
Dan Dugmore – Pedal steel guitar
Mark Hill – Bass guitar
Evan Hutchings – Drums, percussion
Mike Johnson – Pedal steel guitar
Tony Lucido – Bass guitar
Pat McGrath – Banjo, acoustic guitar, mandolin
Jerry McPherson – Electric guitar
Carl Miner – Banjo, bouzouki, acoustic guitar, mandolin
Russ Pahl – Pedal steel guitar
Justin Schipper – Pedal steel guitar
Aaron Sterling – Drums, percussion
Jason Webb – Hammond B-3 organ, piano, synthesizer, Wurlitzer
Derek Wells – Banjo, electric guitar, mandolin

Production

Daniel Bacigalupi – Mixing assistant
Sean R. Badum – Assistant engineer
Charlie Brocco – Assistant engineer
Casey Brown – Programming
busbee – Assistant engineer, digital editing, engineering, production, programming
Dave Clauss – Digital editing, engineering
Jim Cooley – Engineering
Paul "Paco" Cossette – Mixing assistant
Jonathan Fransson – Engineering
Jesse Frasure – Programming
Evan Hutchings – Programming
Scott Johnson – Production assistant
Mason Levy – Programming
Andrew Mendelson – Mastering
Justin Niebank – Mixing assistant
Ernesto Olivera – Assistant engineering
Eric Olson – Programming
Lindsay Rimes – Programming
Juan Sevilla – Assistant engineer
Brandon Shexnayder – Assistant engineering
Reid Shippen – Mixing
Melissa Spillman – Production assistant
Mike Stankiewicz – Assistant engineer
Aaron Sterling – Engineering
Derek Wells – Engineering
Brian David Willis – Digital editing
Steph Wright – A&R

Imagery
Lauren Alaina – Art direction
Karen Naff – Art direction, design

Charts

References

2017 albums
19 Recordings albums
Albums produced by busbee
Lauren Alaina albums
Interscope Records albums
Mercury Nashville albums